Presidential elections were held in the Socialist Republic of Serbia on 12 November 1989 to elect the President of the Presidency. They were the first direct elections since 1974 and the introduction of the delegate system. Slobodan Milošević won the elections with a convincing majority, and he started performing the function of the President of the Presidency of the Socialist Republic of Serbia on May 8.

As the mandate of the members of the Presidency expired at the end of 1989, it was decided that the President of the Presidency would be elected by the citizens in direct elections, while the other members of the Presidency were elected by the Assembly of SR Serbia. In addition to Milosevic, the candidates for the presidency were - Mihalj Kertes, Zoran Pjanic and Dr. Mihailo Djordjevic. Milosevic received 4,452,312 votes in the elections, 80% of the total.

Results

References

Presidential election
Presidential elections in Serbia